Clack Island is part of the Great Barrier Reef Marine Park at the tip of Cape Melville, Queensland in Bathurst Bay, Australia.

It is north-east of Denham Island and Flinders Island in the Flinders Group National Park. It is around 21 hectares or 0.21 square km in size,

Clack Island has a major place in Aboriginal ritual and mythology, and also has a large number of paintings. It is the traditional centre for male ritual activities and is the resting-place of the two culture heroes, Itjibiya and Almbarrin, who are the dominant figures of traditional mythology in the region.

References

Islands on the Great Barrier Reef
Protected areas of Far North Queensland
Rock art in Australia
Uninhabited islands of Australia
Islands of Far North Queensland